The 1948 Western Michigan Broncos football team represented Michigan College of Education (later renamed Western Michigan University) in the Mid-American Conference (MAC) during the 1948 college football season.  In their seventh season under head coach John Gill, the Broncos compiled a 6–3 record (3–1 against MAC opponents), finished in second place in the MAC, and outscored their opponents, 199 to 106.  The team played its home games at Waldo Stadium in Kalamazoo, Michigan.

Fullback Art Gillespie and guard Emerson Grossman were the team captains. Quarterback Hilton Foster received the team's most outstanding player award.

Schedule

References

Western Michigan
Western Michigan Broncos football seasons
Western Michigan Broncos football